The 1988 UC Davis football team represented the University of California, Davis as a member of the Northern California Athletic Conference (NCAC) during the 1988 NCAA Division II football season. Led by Jim Sochor in his 19th and final season, UC Davis compiled an overall record of 7–3–1 with a mark of 5–0 in conference play, winning the NCAC for the 18th title consecutive season. 1988 was the team's 19th consecutive winning season. With the 5–0 conference record, the team stretched their conference winning streak to 41 games dating back to the 1981 season. The Aggies were ranked No. 13 in the final NCAA Division II poll. They advanced to the NCAA Division II Football Championship playoffs, where they lost to Sacramento State in the first round. The team outscored its opponents 300 to 180 for the season. The Aggies played home games at Toomey Field in Davis, California.

Sochor's career at UC Davis was remarkable in its success. His teams won the conference championship in 18 of his 19 years, including 18 straight from 1971 to 1988, and reached the postseason in nine seasons. His teams had a winning record in all 19 seasons, compiling an overall record of 156–41–5, for a .785 winning percentage. In conference play under Sochor, UC Davis was 92–6, for a .939 winning percentage. Sochor was inducted into the College Football Hall of Fame in 1999.

Schedule

References

UC Davis
UC Davis Aggies football seasons
Northern California Athletic Conference football champion seasons
UC Davis Aggies football